2008 was the first competitive season for the Cairns based CRGT Northern Pride Rugby League Football Club. They competed in the QRL state competition, which in 2008 was called the Wizard Queensland Cup. 11 Clubs played 20 matches (10 home and 10 away) over 26 weeks.

The Pride finished 3rd, just losing the Preliminary Final in golden point extra-time to the Souths Logan Magpies, who went on to win the 2008 Grand Final. Foundation coach was Andrew Dunemann, who had played for the Canberra Raiders, Leeds Rhinos, Halifax RLFC and South Sydney Rabbitohs, and had been Under-20s coach for the Canberra Raiders. Assistant coach was David Maiden. Foundation captain was Chris Sheppard, who had played for the North Queensland Cowboys and St. George Illawarra Dragons.

2008 Season -  CRGT Northern Pride

Staff
 Coach: Andrew Dunemann
 Assistant coaches: David Maiden & Troy Cummings
 Captain: Chris Sheppard
 Chief executive: Denis Keeffe
 Chairman: John O’Brien
 Operations manager: Chris Sheppard
 Commercial Manager: Brad Tassell

 Competition: Wizard Queensland Cup

2008 Player awards
Friday 26 September 2008, Pride Leagues Club, Irene Street, Mooroobool
 Yalumba Wines Most Improved Player – Hezron Murgha
 EK Kitchens Best Back – Chey Bird
 Skytrans Airlines Best Forward – Mark Cantoni
 CRGT Player of the Year – Chris Sheppard
 John O’Brien Perpetual Club Person of the Year – Pride Manager, Rob White

Player gains
This was the first season for the Northern Pride, so all players were new signings.

  Ryan Bartlett from QRL's North Queensland Young Guns
  Greg Byrnes from QRL's North Queensland Young Guns
  Brett Anderson from QRL's North Queensland Young Guns
  Warren Jensen from QRL's Wynnum Manly Seagulls
  Josh Vaughan from QRL's Tweed Heads Seagulls
  Joel Riethmuller from QRL's Ipswich Jets
  Gordon Rattler from QRL's Ipswich Jets
  Mark Cantoni from QRL's Eastern Suburbs Tigers
  Ben Laity from QRL's Eastern Suburbs Tigers
 Hezron Murgha from CDRL's Yarrabah Seahawks
 Noel Underwood from CDRL's Yarrabah Seahawks
 Farran Willett from CDRL's Yarrabah Seahawks
 Kahu Wehi from CDRL's Tully Tigers
 Ritchie Marsters from CDRL's Tully Tigers
 Joshua Wehi from CDRL's Tully Tigers
 Alex Starmer from CDRL's Ivanhoes Knights
 Drew Campbell from CDRL's Ivanhoes Knights
 Jason Roos from CDRL's Mareeba Gladiators
 Chris Sheppard from CDRL's Mareeba Gladiators
 Adam Mills from CDRL's Atherton Roosters
 Stephen Sheppard from TDRL's Burdekin and CDRL's Mareeba Gladiators
 Chey Bird from TDRL's (Townsville) Brothers
 Ben Kerr from CDRL's Innisfail
 Eric Warria from Australian Secondary Schools Rugby League Northern Territory team
 Steve McLean from Canberra Raiders juniors.

In Round xx the following player was signed to the Pride:
  Quincy To’oto’o-ulugia from NRL's Cronulla Sharks Jersey Flegg

In Round 10 the following players were signed to the Pride:
  Chris Afamasaga from NRL's Gold Coast Titans . He walked out of the club after Round 18.
  Jamie Frizzo from NRL's North Queensland Cowboys

In Round 12 the following players was signed to the Pride:
   Rod Griffin from NRL's Wests Tigers and PNG Kumuls

In Round 16 the following players was signed to the Pride:
  Luke Harlen from NRL's Wests Tigers

At the start of the season attempts were made to sign players from Papua New Guinea, but problems with visas prevented them playing for the Pride:
  Michael Mark from PNG Kumuls
  Jessie Joe Parker from PNG Kumuls

2008 squad

 Ryan Ghietti 

 Chey Bird

 Drew Campbell

 Hezron Murgha

 Noel Underwood

 Gordon Rattler

 Farren Wilett

 Steve Sheppard

 Eric Warria

 Brett Anderson

 Chris Sheppard

 Jackson Nicolau

 Josh Vaughan

 Jason Roos

 Alex Starmer (Prop)  

 Greg Byrnes

 Ben Laity

 Kahu Wehi

 Adam Mills

 Warren Jensen

 Richie Marsters

 Ben Kerr

 Ben Vaeau

 Matthew Bartlett

 Joel Riethmuller

 Mark Cantoni

 Warren Jensen

 Aaron Payne

 Ashley Graham

 Ben Vaeau

 Carl Webb

 Jackson Nicolau

 Jacob Lillyman

 John Williams

 Justin Smith

 Mark Henry

 Matthew Bartlett

 Matt Bowen

 Ray Cashmere

 Scott Bolton

 Steve Southern

 Ty Williams

Ryan Ghietti

Jordan Kane

2008 Season Launch
 Team Launch - 14 December 2007
 Season Launch - 7 March 2008 at 11.00am, Stockland Cairns. (Originally scheduled as part of the Esplanade Lagoon's 5-year celebrations but moved to Stockland Cairns because of wet season flooding in Cairns.)

Pre-Season Boot Camp
 Croco Dylus Village Camp, Daintree River - 19–20 January 2008

2008 Jerseys

Trial Matches

Wizard Queensland Cup matches

2008 Ladder

Finals Series

2008 Northern Pride players

North Queensland Cowboys who played for the Northern Pride in 2008

2008 Televised Games
In 2008 games were televised by ABC TV and shown live across Queensland through the ABC1 channel at 2.00pm (AEST) on Saturday afternoons. The commentary team was Gerry Collins, Warren Boland and David Wright.
 1: Northern Pride won 34-24: Round 5, Saturday 12 April 2008 against Souths Logan Magpies from Meakin Park, Logan
 2: Northern Pride lost 4-34: Round 8, Saturday 3 May 2008 against Tweed Heads Seagulls from Cudgen Park, Cudgen
 3: Northern Pride won 30-16: Round 11, Saturday 24 May 2008 against Ipswich Jets from Briggs Road Sporting Complex, Ipswich
 4: Northern Pride won 26-10: Round 17, Saturday 12 July 2008 against Easts Tigers from Langlands Park, Stones Corner, Brisbane
 5: Northern Pride won 34-16: Qualifying Final, Saturday 30 August 2008 against Ipswich Jets from Briggs Road Sporting Complex, Ipswich
 6: Northern Pride lost 12-16 : Preliminary Final, Saturday 6 September 2008 against Souths Logan Magpies from Langlands Park, Stones Corner, Brisbane

References

External links
 Northern Pride Official site
 Northern Pride Facebook Page
 Northern Pride Twitter Page
 Northern Pride YouTube Page
 Cairns Post - Northern Pride 2008 photo gallery

Northern Pride RLFC seasons
2008 in Australian rugby league
2008 in rugby league by club